Chasetown is an unincorporated community in Brown County, Ohio.

History
A post office called Chasetown was established in 1889, and remained in operation until 1905. Tradition states the community was so named on account of unfriendly neighbors who chased newcomers away.

References

Unincorporated communities in Brown County, Ohio
Unincorporated communities in Ohio